Hogeschool-Universiteit Brussel (HUBrussel or HUB) was a Dutch language university founded in 2007. HUBrussel was the result of a merger between Brussels-based colleges European University College Brussels, Vlekho, HONIM and Catholic University of Brussels (KUBrussel).

HUBrussel offered degrees both at university and college level for the Flemish Community of Belgium. Degrees were offered both in Dutch and in English.

From 2013 on, university level degrees were organised by KU Leuven. Professional bachelor's degrees remained at HUB till HUB itself merged with the Katholieke Hogeschool Sint-Lieven in 2014 and became Odisee.

History 

European University College Brussels was founded in 1925 as St. Aloysius University College of Economics (EHSAL), as a Dutch-speaking department of the Faculté universitaire Saint-Louis, nowadays Saint-Louis University, Brussels.

At the merger with VLEKHO, HONIM and KUBrussel in 2008, more than 9,000 students were attending classes in undergraduate, graduate and academic advanced programmes at seven faculties. HUBrussel had five faculties in the Brussels-Capital Region and one in the nearby town of Dilbeek, Flanders. There used to be one in Dubai, called European University College Brussels Dubai, but this has been closed.

HUBrussel is associated with the Katholieke Universiteit Leuven.

Programs 

HUBrussel programmes are organised by two educational divisions

Academic bachelors and masters 

The academic bachelors and masters were taken over by the Catholic University of Leuven and are based around three faculties that together offer 13 undergraduate and graduate programmes:

 Economics and management:
 Commercial sciences
 Business engineering
 Environment, health and safety management

 Linguistics and literature:
 Literature
 Applied linguistics
 Interpretation, translation
 Multilingual communication
 Journalism

 Law

Professional bachelors 

The professional bachelors include four fields of study that offer 13 undergraduate programmes:

 Education:
 Nursery teaching
 Primary education
 Secondary education

 Health care:
 Occupational therapy
 Medical imaging
 Nursing
 Optics and optometry

 Social and community work:
 Social work
 Socio-educational care work
 Family sciences

 Commercial sciences and management
 Operations management
 Office management
 Applied informatics

Figures 

 The number of participants in postgraduate programmes and seminars amounts to 9500
 Over 500 regular non-EU students in degree programmes in Brussels
 Over 100 regular (non-Belgian) EU students in degree programmes in Brussels
 Appr. 170 inbound exchange students and 110 outbound exchange students
 Number of staff: 1100

See also 
 Fiscale Hogeschool

External links
 Website Odisee

References 

Universities and colleges in Brussels
Business schools in Belgium
2007 establishments in Belgium
Universities and colleges formed by merger in Belgium